Richard Penn (1784–1863) was an English official of the Colonial Office and writer, the younger son of Richard Penn (1736–1811) the Member of Parliament. He was elected a Fellow of the Royal Society on 18 November 1824, and died unmarried at Richmond, Surrey, on 21 April 1863.

Works
Penn wrote:

On a New Mode of Secret Writing, 1829, on a cipher.
Maxims and Hints for an Angler, and Miseries of Fishing, illustrated by Sir Francis Chantrey London, 1833, with Maxims and Hints for a Chess Player, with portrait-caricatures by Chantrey of the author and himself. An enlarged edition was published in 1839, and another, containing Maxims and Hints on Shooting, appeared in 1855.

Notes

 
Attribution
 

1784 births
1863 deaths
Fellows of the Royal Society
British chess writers